The 1988–89 Tennessee Volunteers basketball team represented the University of Tennessee as a member of the Southeastern Conference during the 1988–89 college basketball season. Led by head coach Don DeVoe, the team played their home games at Thompson–Boling Arena in Knoxville, Tennessee. The Volunteers finished with a record of 19–11 (11–7 SEC, 5th) and received an at-large bid to the 1989 NCAA tournament as the 10 seed in the East region.

Roster

Schedule and results

|-
!colspan=9 style=| Regular season

|-
!colspan=9 style=| SEC tournament

|-
!colspan=9 style=| NCAA tournament

Rankings

NBA draft

References

Tennessee Volunteers basketball seasons
Tennessee
Tennessee
Volunteers
Volunteers